Hilt's law is a geological law that states the deeper the coal, the higher its  rank (grade).  The law holds true if the thermal gradient is entirely vertical, but metamorphism may cause lateral changes of rank, irrespective of depth.  Increasing depth of burial results in a decrease in the oxygen content of the coals.  The phenomenon was observed by professor Carl Hilt (1873).

See also
Coal assay

References
 Coal Geology by Larry Thomas, # , # 
Coal